Carby may be:
 Australian slang for carburetor

People and fictional characters with the surname Carby include:
 Hazel Carby, professor of African American Studies at Yale University
 Carn Carby, character in Ender's Game

See also

 Karby (disambiguation)